Holyhead Golf Club is a golf course to the southeast of Holyhead, in Anglesey, northwestern Wales. It is a 6090-yard par-71 course, which was originally a 9-hole course designed by James Braid in 1912 and opened for play in 1914.

The golf course contains heathland and thick gorse cover. Steve Elliott is a professional at the club.

References

External links
 

Golf clubs and courses in Wales
Sport in Anglesey
1912 establishments in Wales
1912 in Wales
Sports venues completed in 1912
Holyhead